The 13205 / 13206 Janhit Express is an Express train belonging to East Central Railway zone that runs between  and  in India. It is currently being operated with 13205/13206 train numbers on a daily basis.

Service

The 13205/Janhit Express has an average speed of 30 km/hr and covers 221 km in  7h 15m. The 13206/Janhit Express has an average speed of 40 km/hr and covers 221 km in 5h 30m.

Route & Halts 

The important halts of the train are:

Coach composition

The train has standard ICF rakes with max speed of 110 km/h. The train consists of 13 coaches:

 1 
3 AC III Chair Car
 10 General
 2 Head-on Generation

Traction

Both trains are hauled by a Gomoh-based WAP-7 electric locomotive in its entire journey.

Rake sharing 

The train has a single rake with Preventive Maintenance is done at Saharsa.

See also 

 Saharsa Junction railway station
 Danapur railway station
 Lokmanya Tilak Terminus–Guwahati Express (via Katihar)
 Mahananda Express

Notes

References

External links 

 13205/Janhit Express
 13206/Janhit Express

Transport in Patna
Transport in Saharsa
Named passenger trains of India
Rail transport in Bihar
Railway services introduced in 2016
Express trains in India